Guy's Ranch Kitchen is an American reality-based cooking television show hosted by Guy Fieri on Food Network.

References

External links

 

Food Network original programming
2010s American cooking television series